Craspedopoma is a genus of operculate land snails in the family Craspedopomatidae.

The genus is extant but there is at least four fossil species. C. conoidale is from the Miocene of Italy. C. elegans is from the Ulm region of Germany.

References

External links 

 
 
 Craspedopoma at the World Register of Marine Species (WoRMS)

Gastropod genera
Craspedopomatidae